Welcome 2 Tahland is the debut solo album by Tah Mac released on 30 March 2009 under his own label, "Tahmac Entertainment".

Overview
The album includes collaborations with some established as well as new names in music, including former Sugababes Mutya Buena, singer Nyah, the duo Shay & Trix as well as Tia Myrie.

Critical reception

Reception from the album has been mainly positive.

Track listing

Singles
"Lavish Lifestyle" - March 23, 2009
"Give Back" - September 2009

References

2009 debut albums
Hip hop albums by American artists